Koode is a 2018 Indian Malayalam-language psychological drama film written and directed by Anjali Menon, starring Prithviraj Sukumaran, Nazriya Nazim and Parvathy Thiruvothu. The music was released by Muzik 247. The film marks the 100th film of Prithviraj, Parvathy's third collaboration with Prithviraj and second collaboration with both Menon and Nazriya who made her comeback to movies after 4 Years. It was an adaptation of 2014 Marathi film Happy Journey.

Plot
  
The film opens showing Joshua working in a factory in Dubai. He gets an urgent phone call informing him about his sister Jenny's death. The movie then shifts to his landing in his hometown. He attends Jenny's funeral; Josh seems unperturbed even after being shown Jenny's body.
Flashback is shown of how Josh - a 15-year-old, his father a mechanic, and his mother pregnant with his sister are preparing for Christmas festivities at home. At midnight mass, labor pains start and a baby girl is delivered. Josh names his sister Jennifer. The flashback shows how he adores and takes care of his baby sister. Jenny is diagnosed with congenital disease and is expected not to live long, depending on medicines all her life.
The hospital expense takes a toll on the not-so-well-off family and they struggle to keep food on the table. With so much happening in the house, Josh is dismissed from his school as he hasn't been performing well. His father who is aware of his love for machines takes him to a train yard to cheer him up.

Josh's maternal uncle offers help to take Josh to Gulf and put him on some kind of vocation bringing some money to the household. The parents reluctantly agree. The film gently implies, without saying it, that this uncle then raped Josh, and Josh’s early years overseas involved sexual labor.
Josh discovers many creative expressions of Jenny in terms of drawing, poetry in her room. He is introduced to Brownie-Jenny's dog who seems to have taken a liking to Josh. To take a drive down the town, Josh asks his father to lend him a vehicle. Father shows him Jenny's ambulance van which was used for her hospital trips. He drives the van to a lakeside where he spends some time; he discovers that somebody is sleeping in the van's back seat. He finds out that it is his sister Jenny. He comes out of his dream at that point and goes to the van parked outside his house. To his surprise, he does indeed find Jenny alive inside the van talking to him. The girl convinces that she is indeed Jenny and he is the only person who can see/hear/talk to her.
The story now introduces Sophie, the childhood sweetheart of Josh who went on to marry an alcoholic and suffered domestic violence and ended up divorcing him. She is staying with her father and his family. The family members are not happy that she divorced her husband and bad mouth her. Josh and Jenny visit the old dilapidated house that he used to visit back in his childhood. Josh finds Sophie there and they enquire about each other and depart. Sophie back in her house is molested by a younger cousin. She tells this to another relative who interferes. But he advises her that it is not the cousin who is at fault-maybe she herself is an easy target and hence the consequence; depicting his mal intentions as well. She is left aghast at her situation. The next day, Jenny and Josh while roaming about in the van discover Sophie contemplating suicide. Josh comes in the nick of the time and saves her.
Josh tracks down Coach Ashraf who is shown to suffer some memory loss due to old age living in a neglected situation. Josh and Sophie bring him to an old age home and start taking care of him.

Jenny shows Josh her college and tells him about her life there. She tells him about how she liked a boy, Krish who played in a band. Due to her poetic skills, she participates with the band but collapses on one such performance. Krish discovers her disease and deserts her. Josh finds Jenny's diary filled with love poems. He gives it to Krish. Josh finds his father always tinkering toys that village children bring to him. He discovers that his dad has been taking care of his childhood toys in his attic. He becomes emotional. He realizes the love he missed from his father and buries the grudge he has against his father for sending him away at such a young age.

Things seem to take a good turn for a coach. On one such day Coach gives Josh his field whistle seeing how Josh still seemed interested in football.
One day, Sophie and Josh spend time in the old house discussing a book, when her family members come and take her away forcibly. Jenny tells Josh to help Sophie as he knows well how much of a difference someone's support makes when one is alone. Josh all instigated reaches Sophie's house and calls her to come with him. Sophie taken aback by the suddenness refuses to go with him. It starts to rain and Josh drives back and locks him up in his room, angry on why he listened to Jenny. He then sees Sophie walking to his house all drenched. He runs and opens the door and takes her to his room and shuts the door leaving his family shocked about the turn of events. Sophie's family members come to Josh's house enquiring and make them open the room door only to find that both of them have eloped through the window. They both drive through the place living out of their van. Krish catches up with them and invites Josh to the college where they are holding a memorial for Jenny. He then tells Josh that he is ashamed about the way he reacted to Jenny's illness. He discloses that he too liked Jenny. Josh attends the memorial with Sophie. Sophie's relatives come there and attack Josh. Krish and his friends save them from the gang and they escape.

Jenny is happy having seen Krish save her brother. Josh and Sophie are spending the night at the lakeside. Jenny talks to Josh and tells him that he would make an amazing dad. Next morning, Josh discovers that Jenny is nowhere to be found. He then breaks down sensing her absence for the first time after her death and realises how much he will miss her. The film ends with Josh shown to be coaching local lads in football and becoming father to a baby girl.

Cast

 Prithviraj Sukumaran as Joshua Thomas/Josh/Cha
 Nazriya as Jennifer Maria Thomas/Jenny
 Parvathy as Sophie
 Ranjith as Aloshy
 Mala Parvathy as Lilly
 Roshan Mathew as Krish
 Siddharth Menon as Sean
 Atul Kulkarni as Coach Ashraf
 Devan as Ouseppachan, Sophie's father
 Pauly Valsan as Kochuthresiamma
 Sajitha Madathil as Class Teacher
 Santhosh Keezhattoor as Stephen, Lilly's brother
 Hakkim Shah as Simon (Sophie's cousin)
 Sarath Chandran as Abin (Jenny's friend)
 Darshana Rajendran as Alina
 CR Rajan (theater artist) as Joshua's distant relative
 Basil Paulose as Christy, Sophie's cousin
 Arun Sunny as Joe
 Shambu Menon as Monty
 Prajwal Prasad as Benjamin
 Nandhu Pothuval as Vijayan
 Bhadra Sandeep
 Zubin N as Young Joshua
 Baby Mira as Young Jenny
 Mithuna Rajan as Young Sophie
 Neeraja Rajendran

Production
The film began principal photography on 1 November 2017, coinciding with Kerala Piravi. Film's title was announced on 11 June 2018.

Soundtrack
The soundtrack consists four songs written by Rafeeq Ahammed and Shruthy Namboothiri (Koode title track), two each composed by M. Jayachandran and Raghu Dixit. It was released on 15 June 2018 by the label Muzik 247. The background score was composed by Raghu Dixit.

Release
Koode was initially scheduled to be released on 6 July 2018. It was released on 14 July 2018.

Box office
The film was both commercial and critical success and collected ₹40 crore from box office. The film collected ₹92 lakhs from the Bangalore box office.

Accolades

Notes

References

External links
 

2010s Malayalam-language films
Indian psychological drama films
Malayalam remakes of Marathi films
2010s psychological drama films
Films scored by M. Jayachandran
Films scored by Raghu Dixit
2018 drama films
Films directed by Anjali Menon